Oranienburg is a town in Brandenburg, Germany. It is the capital of the district of Oberhavel.

Geography
Oranienburg is a town located on the banks of the Havel river, 35 km north of the centre of Berlin.

Division of the town
Oranienburg consists of nine districts:

 Friedrichsthal
 Germendorf
 Lehnitz
 Malz
 Oranienburg
 Sachsenhausen
 Schmachtenhagen
 Wensickendorf
 Zehlendorf

History

Originally named Bötzow, the town of Oranienburg dates from the 12th century and was first mentioned in 1216. Margrave Albert the Bear (ruled 1157–1170) allegedly ordered the construction of a castle on the banks of the Havel. Around the castle stood a settlement of traders and craftsmen.

In 1646, Friedrich Wilhelm I of Brandenburg married Louise Henriette of Orange-Nassau (German: Oranien-Nassau). She was so attracted by the town of Bötzow that her husband presented the entire region to her. The princess ordered the construction of a new castle in the Dutch style and called it Oranienburg or Schloss Oranienburg. In 1653 the town of Bötzow was renamed Oranienburg.

Silvio Gesell, the founder of Freiwirtschaft ("free economy"), lived in Oranienburg between 1911 and 1915, publishing his magazine, Der Physiocrat. He returned to the town in 1927 and lived there until his death in 1930. The town remained a center of the "free economy" movement until the Nazi régime outlawed it in 1933, and many of Gesell's followers ended up as prisoners in the town's concentration camp.

The Oranienburg concentration camp (established in March 1933) was among the earliest of the Nazis concentration camps. In 1936, the Sachsenhausen concentration camp on the outskirts of Oranienburg replaced it; there 200,000 people were interned over the nine years that the Nazis operated it. The Nazis murdered about 22,000 people there before the liberation of the camp by the Soviet Red Army in 1945. Thereafter the site reopened in August 1945 as "Soviet Special Camp 7". A further 12,000 people (mostly Nazis not awaiting trial) died under the Soviets before the Special Camp closed in 1950. Their remains were not discovered until the 1990s.

Oranienburg became the center of Nazi Germany's nuclear-energy project because it was the location of the Auergesellschaft Oranienburg Plant, Germany's uranium production facility; the town also had an armaments hub, aircraft plant, and railway junction, all of military importance. According to military historian Antony Beevor, Stalin's desire to acquire the nuclear facility motivated him to launch the Battle for Berlin of April–May 1945. It has been claimed that the pre-emptive destruction of these nuclear facilities by the USAAF Eighth Air Force on 15 March 1945 aimed to prevent them from falling into Soviet hands.

On 23 April 1945, during the Battle of Berlin, troops of the 1st Belorussian Front of the Red Army captured Oranienburg.

Due to its heavy bombing, Oranienburg is the "most dangerous town in Germany"; it is the only town in Germany which pursues a systematic search for unexploded ordnance (UXO) based on postwar aerial photos and magnetic or radar underground measurements for metal. By 2017 about 200 had been disposed of, and 350 to 400 were estimated to remain. It is estimated that the search and disposal will continue throughout the rest of the century. In one case 12,000 residents had to be evacuated. The federal government does not finance the removal of foreign UXO.

Public institutions
The Zehlendorf transmission facility, a large facility for radio broadcasting in longwave, medium wave and FM-range, was located near Oranienburg, at Zehlendorf.

Transport
The town is served by the Berlin Northern Railway and provide a direct connection to Rostock.

Demography

Twin towns – sister cities

Oranienburg is twinned with:
 Bagnolet, France (1964)
 Hamm, Germany (1990)
 Mělník, Czech Republic (1974)
 Vught, Netherlands (2000)

Notable people

Friedrich Ludwig Dulon (1769–1826), flutist and composer
Walther Bothe (1891–1957), physicist and Nobel laureate
Carl Gustav Hempel (1905–1997), philosopher
W. Michael Blumenthal (born 1926), business leader, economist and political adviser
Bernd Eichwurzel (born 1964), rower, Olympic champion
Alexander Walke (born 1983), footballer
Marcus Mlynikowski (born 1992), footballer

See also
Oranienburg railway station
Stellwerk Fichtengrund

References

External links

 

 
Localities in Oberhavel